Fei Shi ( 214–234, died after 234), courtesy name Gongju, was an official of the state of Shu Han during the Three Kingdoms period of China.

Life
Fei Shi was from Nan'an County (南安縣), Qianwei Commandery (犍為郡), which is around present-day Leshan, Sichuan. He originally served under Liu Zhang, the Governor of Yi Province (covering present-day Sichuan and Chongqing), as the Prefect of Mianzhu County (綿竹縣).

In 214, after the warlord Liu Bei seized control of Yi Province from Liu Zhang, Fei Shi came into the service of Liu Bei. Between 214 and 219, Fei Shi held a number of appointments in Liu Bei's administration, including Administrator (太守) of Zangke Commandery (牂牁郡). Around 219, after Liu Bei declared himself King of Hanzhong, he tasked Fei Shi with travelling to Jing Province to inform Guan Yu about his appointment as General of the Vanguard (前將軍). However, when Guan Yu learned that Huang Zhong would server as the General of the Rear (後將軍), he angrily said, "I would never allow myself to share the same rank as this old soldier!". He was adamant in his resolution not to accept the appointment.

Fei Shi, in order to convince Guan Yu, said to him :

After Guan Yu heard Fei Shi's argument, he was greatly moved and hurriedly accepted the appointment.

In 221, when Liu Bei declared himself emperor and established the Shu Han state, Fei Shi wrote a memorial to express his strong objection to Liu Bei's coronation. He argued that Liu Bei should not declare himself emperor until he had vanquished Shu's rival state, Cao Wei, which replaced the Eastern Han dynasty in 220; he cited the example of Liu Bang, the founder of the Han dynasty, who only declared himself emperor after defeating his rival Xiang Yu in the Chu–Han Contention. His memorial was as such : Liu Bei was so displeased that he had Fei Shi demoted to serve as a low-ranking official in Yongchang Commandery (永昌郡) in the remote southern parts of Shu.

Xi Zuochi, with regards to Fei Shi's outspoken and perhaps too honest opposition, commented: "Before establishing himself, a monarch must await the perfect conditions to lay the foundations for his state. However when a ruler desires to continue a previous dynasty, he must be swift to connect with the people's hearts. Therefore when Duke Hui of Jin was captured by his enemy, his son was already enthroned the next day. While Gengshi Emperor was still alive, Emperor Guangwu of Han already succeeded him. How could this be considered forgetting past customs for his own benefit? It is a matter of keeping the State's altars. Now, Xianzhu (Liu Bei) gathered many soldiers to defeat his enemy. The enemy is indeed strong and the task arduous, the previous ruler removed from his position and the State with no head, while the temples of the previous Han emperors no longer receive sacrifices. If not someone worthy and related took up the mantle, who would do it? Accepting succession and honoring the Heavens: how could this compare with Xiang Yu and how could Liu Bei refuse to take the now vacant throne? With this, Liu Bei could honor the previous emperors and with his example encourage others, unite his people toward a common goal which was the restoration of the Han and the destruction of the rebels. Not seeing that is indeed foolish. Therefore, Fei Shi's dismissal and demotion was appropriate!" Pei Songzhi agreed with Xi Zuochi's assessment. 

In 225, Fei Shi accompanied Zhuge Liang on the southern campaign against rebel forces in southern Shu's Nanzhong region and when they returned and reached Hanyang County (漢陽縣) met a surrendered man named Li Hong (李鴻). When Li Hong met Zhuge Liang, Jiang Wan and Fei Shi were in attendance. Li Hong reported that he had recently met Meng Da;  Wang Chong (王沖) who just recently deserted Shu told Meng that when Meng defected to Wei, your enlightened excellency (Zhuge Liang) was very angry and wished to punish Meng Da's wives and children by association. However, Xianzhu (Liu Bei) refused to listen to your advice. When he heard this, Meng Da said that Your Excellency understood human nature and acting otherwise would then be against said human nature. He truly did not believe what Wang Chong said and greatly trusts and admire you. It is only that he has no way to return to you.

When he heard of this, Zhuge Liang told Jiang Wan and Fei Shi to return to the capital and start exchanging letters with Meng Da. Fei Shi replied that Meng Da was a petty man. While in the past, he betrayed a man lacking authority (Liu Zhang), he also betrayed Xianzhu. Meng has no firm allegiance; how is he worthy of exchanging letters with him (Fei Shi)? Zhang Liang was silent and could not answer.

Zhuge Liang wanted to convince Meng Da to help him from inside Wei and so with him exchange letters :

Meng Da received letters from Zhuge Liang and began communicating with him. He told Zhuge that he wished to rebel against Wei. However, Wei sent Sima Yi to campaign against him and defeated then beheaded Meng Da. Due to the swift actions of Sima Yi and because he doubted the sincerity of Meng Da, Zhuge Liang could not rescue him.

When Zhuge Liang launched a series of military campaigns against Shu's rival state Wei, Fei Shi remained in the Shu capital Chengdu to handle domestic affairs. He was appointed as a Counsellor Remonstrant (諫議大夫) sometime after Zhuge Liang's death in 234, when Jiang Wan was the head of government in Shu. He died not long later.

Fei Shi had at least one son, Fei Li (费立). Fei Li served as Cavalier Regular Attendant under the Jin dynasty. After Fei Shi's death, many of the most prominent and reputed officials of Yi Province with the surname Fei (费) were his descendants.

Wang Chong
The previously mentioned Wang Chong was a man from the commandery of Guanghan (廣漢). He served as a General of Standard (牙門將) and was a subordinate of Li Yan. However, he was hated by Li and in fear of punishment, Wang surrendered to Wei. The Wei administration appointed him the Administrator of Leling (樂陵太守).

See also 
 Lists of people of the Three Kingdoms

References 

 Chen, Shou (3rd century). Records of the Three Kingdoms (Sanguozhi).
 Pei, Songzhi (5th century). Annotations to Records of the Three Kingdoms (Sanguozhi zhu).

Year of birth unknown
Year of death unknown
Liu Zhang and associates
Shu Han politicians
Politicians from Leshan
Political office-holders in Guizhou